John Coughlin is a retired American soccer defender who spent eleven seasons with the Minnesota Thunder.

Coughlin graduated from St. Paul Academy where he was an All State high school soccer player. In 1990, he was on the Spartan Randolph Blackhawks team which won the McGuire Cup (U-19 national championship). In 1991, Coughlin played a single season with University of Wisconsin–Milwaukee soccer team. He then transferred to the University of Vermont for 1992 and 1993 collegiate seasons. In 1991, Coughline joined the Minnesota Thunder, an unaffiliated amateur club. He retired at the end of the 2001 season. In 1994, Minnesota entered the USISL. In 1999, he was Second Team All League as the Thunder won the USL A-League championship. From 1996 to 2001, he played 107 league games and scored 8 goals.

References

Living people
1972 births
Sportspeople from Saint Paul, Minnesota
Soccer players from Minnesota
American soccer players
Minnesota Thunder players
Milwaukee Panthers men's soccer players
USISL players
Vermont Catamounts men's soccer players
USL Second Division players
USISL Select League players
A-League (1995–2004) players
Association football defenders